The Piaski coal mine is a large mine in the east of Poland in Piaski, Lublin Voivodeship, 200 km east of the capital, Warsaw. Piaski represents one of the largest coal reserve in Poland having estimated reserves of 136.4 million tonnes of coal. The annual coal production is around 4.5 million tonnes.

References

External links 
 Official site

Coal mines in Poland
Buildings and structures in Lublin Voivodeship